Luxembourg was represented by well-known German singer Jürgen Marcus, with the song "Chansons pour ceux qui s'aiment", at the 1976 Eurovision Song Contest, which took place on 3 April in The Hague. For the first time ever, broadcaster RTL organised a public national final rather than their usual method of internal selection. Marcus was the first German singer to represent Luxembourg, as their 1974 representative Ireen Sheer, although German-based, was British by birth.

Before Eurovision

National final 
No information on date, location, host or scoring system is currently known about the national final. A total of five acts took part.

At Eurovision 

On the night of the final Marcus performed 5th in the running order, following  and preceding , and conducted by Jo Plée. The song was oddly structured as it gave the impression of being a typical Eurovision big ballad until the schlager-esque chorus suddenly kicked in. At the close of voting "Chansons pour ceux qui s'aiment" had picked up 17 points, placing Luxembourg 14th of the 18 entries. The Luxembourgian jury awarded the only 12 points of the evening to Monaco.

It was succeeded as Luxembourgish representative at the 1977 contest by Anne-Marie Besse with "Frère Jacques".

Voting

References

External links
 Detailed info & lyrics, The Diggiloo Thrush, "Chansons pour ceux qui s'aiment"

1976
Countries in the Eurovision Song Contest 1976
Eurovision